Gone may refer to:

Grammar
 Gone, the past participle of go (verb)
 Have gone or have been, contrasting verb forms in some contexts

Arts, entertainment, and media

Film
 Gone, a 2002 a thriller written, directed by and starring Tim Chey
 Gone, a 2004 film, directed by Paul Zoltan
 Gone, a 2006 American short starring Amanda Noret
 Gone (2007 film), a British/Australian thriller
 Gone, a 2007 American short starring Barbara Tarbuck
 Gone, a 2007 Canadian short starring Cory Monteith
 Gone, a 2009 American short starring Rafael Morais
 Gone, a 2011 TV movie featuring Molly Parker
 Gone (2012 film), an American thriller starring Amanda Seyfried
 Gone (2021 film), a Nigerian thriller

Literature
 Gone (Hayder novel), written by Mo Hayder & winner of the 2012 Edgar Award
 Gone (Kellerman novel), a 2006 Alex Delaware novel by Jonathan Kellerman
 Gone (novel series), a series of young-adult novels by Michael Grant, or the first novel in the series
"Gone", a 1996 story by John Crowley which won the Locus Award for Best Short Story
 Gone, a 2010 radio play featuring Danny Lee Wynter

Music

Bands and labels
 Gone (band), an American punk-based instrumental rock band
 Gone Records, an American record label

Albums
 Gone (Beasts of Bourbon album), 1997
 Gone (Dwight Yoakam album) or the title song, "Gone (That'll Be Me)", 1995
 Gone (Mono album) or the title song, 2007
 Gone (Red album), 2017
 Gone (Vacationer album) or the title song, 2012
 Gone or the title song, by Bill Madden, 2006
 Gone, by Entwine, 2001
 Gone or the title song, by Keren DeBerg, 2004
 Gone, an EP by Jack & Jack, 2017

Songs
 "Gone" (Afrojack song), 2016
 "Gone" (Bebe Rexha song), 2014
 "Gone" (Charli XCX and Christine and the Queens song), 2019
 "Gone" (Coldrain song), 2015
 "Gone!" (The Cure song), 1996
 "Gone" (Dierks Bentley song), 2020
 "Gone" (Ferlin Husky song), 1957
 "Gone" (JR JR song)
 "Gone" (Kanye West song), 2005
 "Gone" (Kelly Clarkson song), 2004
 "Gone" (Lasgo song), 2009
 "Gone" (Montgomery Gentry song), 2004
 "Gone" (Nelly song), 2011
 "Gone" (NSYNC song), 2001
 "Gone" (Pearl Jam song), 2006
 "Gone" (Rosé song), 2021
 "Gone" (Switchfoot song), 2003
 "Gone" (TobyMac song), 2004
 "Gone" (U2 song), 1997
 "Gone", by Alexis Jordan
 "Gone", by …And You Will Know Us by the Trail of Dead from X: The Godless Void and Other Stories
 "Gone", by Asking Alexandria from The Black
 "Gone", by Bad Wolves from Dear Monsters
 "Gone", by Bazzi from Cosmic
 "Gone", by Ben Folds from Rockin' the Suburbs
 "Gone", by Bone Thugs-n-Harmony from Uni5: The World's Enemy
 "Gone", by the Bouncing Souls from How I Spent My Summer Vacation
 "Gone", by Built to Spill from You in Reverse
 "Gone", by BWO from Prototype
 "Gone", by Crooked X from Crooked X
 "Gone", by Dannii Minogue from Club Disco
 "Gone", by Daughtry from Daughtry
 "Gone", by Diana Ross from Take Me Higher
 "Gone", by Fuel from Angels & Devils
 "Gone", by the Head and the Heart from Let's Be Still
 "Gone", by Ho Yeow Sun
 "Gone", by Jack Johnson from On and On
 "Gone!", by James Otto from Days of Our Lives
 "Gone", by Jerry Cantrell from Degradation Trip Volumes 1 & 2
 "Gone", by Kaskade from Redux EP 002
 "Gone", by Katatonia from Discouraged Ones
 "Gone", by Kelly Rowland from Talk a Good Game
 "Gone", by Liam Gallagher from Why Me? Why Not.
 "Gone", by Lianne La Havas
 "Gone", by M83 from Dead Cities, Red Seas & Lost Ghosts
 "Gone", by Machine Gun Kelly from General Admission
 "Gone", by Madonna from Music
 "Gone", by Matt Simons from Pieces
 "Gone", by Moby from Baby Monkey
 "Gone", by Noa Kirel, 2023
 "Gone", by Paradise Lost from Believe in Nothing
 "Gone", by Sevendust from Seasons
 "Gone", by Shirley Bassey
 "Gone", by the Tea Party from Triptych
 "Gone", by Thelma Houston from Breakwater Cat
 "Gone", by Thirteen Senses from The Invitation
 "Gone", by Vérité
 "Gone", by The Weeknd from Thursday

Television 
 Gone (TV series), a 2017 TV series

Episodes
 "Gone" (The 4400)
 "Gone" (Buffy the Vampire Slayer)
 "Gone" (Law & Order: Criminal Intent)
 "Gone" (Lie to Me)
 "Gone" (NCIS)
 "Gone" (Smallville)
 "Gone" (SpongeBob SquarePants)

Other uses
 410 Gone, an HTTP status code
 Euphemism for saying that one has just died

See also
 Go (disambiguation)
 Gone, Gone, Gone (disambiguation)
 Gonne (disambiguation)